Framvöllur is a multi-use stadium in Reykjavík, Iceland.  It is currently used mostly for football matches and is the home stadium of Kórdrengir. Its capacity is around 1200.

References 

Football venues in Iceland